The Man! is the second solo album by Leroy Hutson. The photography was by Joel Brodsky. The album expands on the lush arrangements of Love Oh Love.

Track listing

"Can't Say Enough About Mom" (Leroy Hutson, Michael Hawkins)	6:14 	
"Gotta Move - Gotta Groove" (Daniel Reed, Quinton Joseph, Tony Green)	3:38	
"Ella Weez" (Leroy Hutson, Michael Hawkins)	3:01 	
"Give This Love a Try" (Eugene Dixon, James Thompson)	3:35	
"The Ghetto '74" (Donny Hathaway, Leroy Hutson)	4:34 	
"After The Fight" (Daniel Reed, Quinton Joseph, Tony Green)	3:17 	
"Could This Be Love" (Leroy Hutson, Michael Hawkins)	3:08 	
"Dudley Do-Right" (Daniel Reed, Quinton Joseph, Leroy Hutson)	3:44

Personnel
Leroy Hutson - clavinet, ARP synthesizer, electric piano, lead vocals
Phil Upchurch - guitar, sitar
Quinton Joseph - drums
Michael Hawkins - electric piano 
Joseph "Lucky" Scott - bass
Fred Walker (Derf Reklaw) - bongos, congas, tabla
Jerry Wilson - tenor and alto saxophone
Janice Hutson, The Natural Four, Galaxy, Eulaulah Hathaway - backing vocals
Jerry Long - arrangements

Charts

Singles

External links 
 Leroy Hutson-The Man at Discogs

References 

1974 albums
Leroy Hutson albums
Curtom Records albums
Albums with cover art by Joel Brodsky